The 1952 Bolivian Primera División, the first division of Bolivian football (soccer), was played by 8 teams, all hailing from La Paz and played their matches at the Hernando Siles Stadium. The champion was The Strongest.

Torneo Interdepartamental

Standings

External links
 Official website of the LFPB 

Bolivian Primera División seasons
Bolivia
1952 in Bolivian sport